August Tamman (also August Tammann; 17 December 1893 Suure-Kõpu Parish, Viljandi County – 27 July 1934 Tallinn) was an Estonian politician. He was a member of III Riigikogu. He was a member of the Riigikogu since 22 April 1927. He replaced Otto August Strandman. He was also the Secretary of III Riigikogu.

References

1893 births
1934 deaths
Members of the Riigikogu, 1926–1929